Vidal, California is a small unincorporated community located in southeastern California, in San Bernardino County on U.S. Route 95,  north of Blythe, California, United States and  south of Needles. Wyatt Earp spent the last winters of his life in Vidal, working claims of gold and copper he found nearby; the aforementioned townsite of Earp is located in and around those claims.

During the late 1960s, Vidal was home to Solar Lodge, a secret society located four miles (6 km) south of the town center. The Lodge owned all of the businesses in the town during their time there, but left the area after several members were arrested for child abuse, in a case that became famous as "The Boy in the Box".

On February 5, 1979, a Santa Fe Railway train derailed 17 cars in the middle out of 74 cars two miles (3.2 km) west of Vidal. According to the railroad, five tankers ruptured. The spillage of residual fuel oil was disposed of through burning, and the railroad intended to send pumps to the site.

The ZIP code for both Vidal and nearby Vidal Junction is 92280 and the area codes 442 and 760.

Weather
The highest temperature ever recorded in Vidal was in 1905, when the temperature reached .

The part of the Sonoran Desert where Vidal is located receives very little rainfall in a normal year.

Structures in Vidal
These are images of the structures in the ghost town of Vidal.

External links 
 Wyatt Earp's Cottage - Vidal, California

References

 
 Local Weather

Communities in the Lower Colorado River Valley
Populated places in the Sonoran Desert
Unincorporated communities in San Bernardino County, California
Unincorporated communities in California